Charalampos Brilakis (born 28 October 1981) is a Greek professional football player, currently playing as a defender for Panargiakos.

Career
He started his professional career in 2004 for Lilas, which was then playing at Gamma Ethniki. He played the majority of his career in Football League side Kalamata, where he made 102 appearances in four years. Later he joined Diagoras and Trikala, before signing a one-year contract on 9 September 2011 with Superleague side Doxa Drama. On 18 July 2013 he signed an annual contract with Football League outfit Iraklis.

References

External links
Iraklis F.C. player profile
Onsports.gr profile 

1981 births
Living people
Doxa Drama F.C. players
Kalamata F.C. players
Trikala F.C. players
Diagoras F.C. players
Iraklis Thessaloniki F.C. players
Kallithea F.C. players
Super League Greece players
Association football defenders
Footballers from Athens
Greek footballers